is a Japanese rhythm game developed by Nintendo SPD and published by Nintendo. It was released in Japan on August 3, 2006, and was the last game developed by Nintendo for the Game Boy Advance. An arcade version of the game was reprogrammed and published by Sega (later named Sega Corporation) on September 20, 2007. Both versions were released in Japan exclusively. The game has spawned three international sequels; Rhythm Heaven, Rhythm Heaven Fever, and Rhythm Heaven Megamix. It began as an idea created by its composer and supervisor Tsunku who proposed it to Nintendo due to his belief that they could do a better job with it than he could.

Rhythm Tengokus gameplay focuses on audio cues rather than visual cues to convey information to players. It features a number of unique stages which have their own type of rhythm and gameplay. Players follow the rhythm (in some rhythm games as a character) until the end where they are given a score based on their performance. The gameplay and music were both well received by critics and consumers. Parallels have been drawn between it and the developer's previous work on the WarioWare series.

Gameplay
Rhythm Tengoku is a rhythm game similar to the WarioWare series of video games due in part to its simplistic controls and art style. Due to Rhythm Tengoku being similar to the WarioWare series, it includes a reference to Orbulon's Alien Bunnies or also known originally as Space Hares are used as a replacement for the Squadmates from the minigame Marching Orders in the sequel for Marching Orders, Marching Orders 2. Rhythm Tengoku features eight sets which consist of six rhythm games each (all of which are unique to each other). Each set's sixth stage is a remix of the previous games all at once. The games change in turn throughout the remix, which is accompanied by a new song. Some remixes (such as Remix 5) might even have characters wearing alternate costumes. The sixth, seventh and eighth sets consist of stages that were based on previous games, but are much harder. Players unlock more rhythm games by completing the rhythm games in order. The object of each rhythm game is to match the rhythm the game expects of players which varies from stage to stage. The game primarily relies on audio cues to indicate the rhythm; while it uses visual cues as well, it will sometimes subvert players' expectations with them. Each Rhythm Game usually lasts for 1 to 2 minutes, with rare deviations. Players are given one of three ratings at the end of every stage - Try Again, OK, and Superb. Players must achieve an OK rank in order to proceed to the next game. Players who achieve Superb receive a medal which can be used to unlock Endless Games, Rhythm Toys, and Drum Lessons. The player needs to clear all five games and the Remix in the Set with at least an OK to move on. 

On some occasions, players are allowed to attempt a Perfect Campaign of a randomly selected stage. If players make any misses in the stage while making the attempt, a life/chance is lost, and the player must restart the stage from the beginning. Players have three lives/chances to attempt this before it either disappears or moves on to another rhythm game. Players who succeed receive an in-game certificate as well as a gift (varying on the rhythm game). If they obtain all certificates, they get a special certificate as well as access to all songs in the drum mode. The game's drum controls allow players to use the different buttons on the Game Boy Advance to control various aspects of the drums.

In the Arcade version of the game, players start the game with two hearts. Each heart is lost when starting a Rhythm Game. Getting a Superb or Perfect gives the player an extra heart. If the player runs out of hearts, they will need to spend a credit to continue (or, depending on the machine's settings, multiple credits, or none if set to Free Mode). All of the Rhythm Games are available from the start in this arcade version, but the player needs to clear all five games per Set with at least an OK in order to play the Remix (Depending on the settings, the Remix may be unselectable, requiring the player to clear all the games in order to play it). There is also a 2 Player Mode for this version. In addition, some games that didn't receive tutorials in the GBA release now have practice sessions for them. If the player has played perfectly for the first half of a Rhythm Game, the "Go for a Perfect!" notice will appear on the bottom of the screen, and obtaining it does the same as getting a Superb. The Arcade version has a leaderboard feature, which tallies up the score based on the player's Flow at the end of a stage.

Development

The game's development began sometime in 2002, under the working title of Rhythm IQ, when Kazuyoshi Osawa had created a tech demo for the GBA where players could play a drum kit, with each button on the console being designated to a different drum. The Drum Lessons and Concert Hall modes are directly derived from this original concept for the final game, four years later. Originally, the Rhythm Games would have been separated in categories, with each one specializing in different aspects of rhythm; but the ultimate decision was to have the games assorted, with the reasoning being that sorting the games like that could have made the progression much more monotonous.

In 2004, Tsunku brought his proposal to Nintendo of a rhythm game that did not rely on visual indicators for its rhythm. Osawa was wary that people would enjoy it due to its lack of a music score as he felt that it might only appeal to a niche audience. It was decided to be released on the GBA due to Osawa's desire for a smaller screen and portability. Several of the game's staff members came to Tokyo for development research and inspiration to take dance lessons in order to improve their rhythm by the recommendation of the game's music composer Tsunku, dancing to the music of Remixes 1, 2, and 4. One stage that made an impression was Rhythm Tweezers, a level that featured an onion with a face from which players pluck its hair. It was originally going to be a real face, but it was deemed "a little too gross." Another stage is called The Bon Odori and is based on the real-world Japanese Bon Festival.

The music in Rhythm Tengoku is sequenced, as there was not enough space to put streamed music into the game. To save space on the GBA cartridge, the game's music is stored as MIDIs, and it uses its own soundfont for its instrument samples in the music and the in-game sound effects. Several vocal songs were made for the game. In Karate Man, a theme based on a poem in the Rhythm Poem Collection titled "Karate Rhythm" is present. Ami Tokito provided the vocals for the song used in The Bon Odori, and her song, "Love's Honey Sweet Angel" is used in the 3rd Remix. "WISH - I Can't Wait For You" by Soshi Tanaka is used in the 5th Remix.

Before the game's release, a Kiosk Demo named Rhythm Tengoku: Trial Version was playable in shops, allowing people to try out the game before it was released. The Kiosk Demo only lets the player play three of the Rhythm Games from Set 1; Karate Man, Rhythm Tweezers and The Clappy Trio, as well as the Rhythm Test (only the first part of it can be played through). The Kiosk Demo also reminds the game's price of 3,800 Yen on the title screen, the Rhythm Game select menu, and even in the Rhythm Games themselves (appearing at the end of The Clappy Trio and Rhythm Tweezers, and in the background of Karate Man once the player reaches 50% (three hearts or more) on the Flow Meter).

Rhythm Tengoku was first revealed in an issue of Famitsu, and was released in Japan only during August 3, 2006 for the Game Boy Advance (GBA) and was developed by Nintendo SPD and published by Nintendo. Key staff members include Kazuyoshi Osawa, Tsunku (music composer and supervisor), Masami Yone (sound designer), and Ko Takeuchi (graphic designer).

One year after the game's release, Sega approached the staff with an offer to co-develop an arcade version of the game for the Sega Naomi, which was released September 20, 2007. This was due to the popularity of the game with its development staff. Osawa brought this offer to the attention of Nintendo president Satoru Iwata and others who approved of the idea. Yone had to make adjustments in the arcade version due to the differences between arcade mechanics and console mechanics. The arcade version had remastered graphics (One rhythm game to have this change in the arcade version (most notably) was Karate Man). It also featured an extra set based on Set 1, but at 150% speed and with newly remixed music to match (Note: The vocals in the Karate Man: Tempo Up! extra stage are the same).

The arcade release also features multiplayer, even though the first main Rhythm Heaven game to have multiplayer was Rhythm Heaven Fever for the Wii. Rhythm Tengoku was also the only game licensed by Nintendo for the Sega Naomi, and it was one of the very few games developed by Nintendo and Sega respectively.

Reception
Rhythm Tengoku has received generally positive reception. While it did not receive much attention before its release it was very well received by consumers. The game received an Excellence Prize for Entertainment at the 10th annual Japan Media Arts Festival in 2006. Video game designer Frank Lantz listed Rhythm Tengoku amongst his five favourite games. Eurogamer's staff ranked it the 36th best game of 2006 while its readership voted it the 50th best. Tom of Eurogamer called it the best Game Boy Advance game of the year while he and fellow Eurogamer staff member James felt that it was at least on par with Elite Beat Agents (which also received positive reception). GameSpy's Andrew Alfonso praised its music, gameplay, and variety; he felt however that it was not long enough. GamesRadar staff included the game's drum lessons in its list of the "20 Magical Nintendo moments". A reviewer at Computer and Video Games (CVG) gave praise to it for its Pocket Fighter and WarioWare-like humour and its quality music but felt that the game lacked replay value and length. Kotaku's Brian Ashcraft called it "one of the Game Boy Advance's most interesting (and enjoyable) titles". GamesRadar's Shane Patterson recommended it for people who liked WarioWares art aesthetics and music. CVGs Andy Kelly included the Bon Odori song in his list of the 100 best video game themes ever. He called it "insanely catchy." Eurogamer's Chris Schilling used Rhythm Tengoku as an example of a game that would be overlooked if the Game Boy Advance was region-locked. 1UP.com's Bob Mackey called its lack of an American release "one of the great Game Boy Advance injustices of 2006". Wireds Chris Kohler noted that Rhythm Tengoku (as well as other games) should be released on the Virtual Console or WiiWare services, but it was not.

Legacy
Rhythm Tengoku has since received three sequels. The first was titled Rhythm Heaven for the Nintendo DS and was the first game in the series to be released outside of Japan. It uses touchscreen controls rather than buttons. The next game was titled Rhythm Heaven Fever. It was released on the Wii, then it was re-released on the Wii U 5 years after the game came out on the Wii in Japan. It featured button controls and had unlockable extra stages that originate from Rhythm Tengoku. The games were titled Rhythm Paradise and Beat the Beat: Rhythm Paradise in Europe respectively.

The fourth game in the series is titled Rhythm Heaven Megamix and features rhythm games from Tengoku, Heaven and Fever, along with several new rhythm games of its own. It is, however, missing several games, seemingly for either space concerns or other reasons.

Rhythm Heaven also gets referenced frequently in the WarioWare and Super Smash Bros. series.

Rhythm Tengoku and its sequels were the source of inspiration for independent video games such as Beat Sneak Bandit and Karateka Mania. Simon Flesser (designer of Beat Sneak Bandit) cites Rhythm Tengokus artistic design and mixture of beats and back beats as influences in its design.

In April 2010, THQ released a game heavily inspired by Rhythm Tengoku called Beat City.

An unofficial English translation of Rhythm Tengoku, called Rhythm Heaven Silver, was released in 2019.

Notes

References

External links
Official Website 
Rhythm Tengoku Arcade at Sega.jp  (archive)

2006 video games
2007 video games
Arcade video games
Nintendo franchises
Rhythm Heaven
Nintendo Research & Development 1 games
Game Boy Advance games
Japan-exclusive video games
Sega arcade games
Video games developed in Japan
Music video games